BYOA or Bring-Your-Own-Access is an approach to wireless remote access to a company's network for mobile workers and home workers.  With BYOA, end users are still obliged to form their own contract with a wireless network operator.  The remote user's software may recognise mobile hardware, such as a wireless data card, in their computer, and set up a data session over a VPN or other remote access client, but end users are still exposed to the fact that their connectivity is built up from separate components.

Whilst this has been shown to be an effective means of providing connectivity, it detracts from global network providers' user experience and branding, and BYOA is therefore often regarded as an interim approach.

Example
A user may subscribe to a Vodafone Mobile Connect USB Modem and then use their company's VPN to access corporate applications.

Wireless networking